Potter is an English surname that originally referred to someone who made pottery. It is occasionally used as a given name. People with the name include:

Surname
Albert Potter (1897–1942), English footballer
Alexandra Potter (born 1970), British author
Alfie Potter (born 1989), English football player
Alfred Potter (1827–1878), English clergyman and cricketer
Allen Potter (1818–1885), American politician
Alonzo Potter (1800–1865, Bishop of Pennsylvania
A. J. Potter "Archie" (1918–1980), Irish composer
Arnold Potter (1804–1872), American self-declared Messiah
Art Potter (1909–1998), Canadian ice hockey administrator
Barbara Potter (born 1961), American tennis player
Barnaby Potter (1577–1642), Bishop of Carlisle
Beatrix Potter (1866–1943), British children's writer
Bert Potter (disambiguation), several people including: 
Bert Potter (composer) (1874–1930), American composer
Beryl H. Potter (1900-1985), American astronomer
Beryl Potter (d. 1998), Canadian disability rights activist
Bill Potter (1872–1970), Australian footballer for Fitzroy
Bill Potter (musician), country singer and television personality
Brandon Potter (born 1982), American voice actor
Carol Potter (poet), American poet
Carol Potter (actress) (born 1948), American actress
Cassandra Potter (born 1981), American curler
Charles E. Potter (1916–1979), American politician
Cherry Potter, British journalist
Christopher Potter (disambiguation), several people, including:
Christopher Potter (1591–1646), English academic and clergyman
Christopher Potter (died 1817), MP for Colchester 1781–2 and 1784
Chris Potter (priest) (born 1949), Dean and Archdeacon of St Asaph
Christopher Potter (author) (born 1959), English author and publisher
Chris Potter (actor) (born 1960), Canadian actor, musician and pitchman
Chris Potter (jazz saxophonist) (born 1971), American jazz saxophonist and composer
Chris Potter (record producer), British record producer and mixer
Cipriani Potter (1792–1871) British composer, pianist and educator
Clare Potter (1903–1999), American fashion designer
Clarkson Nott Potter (1825–1882), American civil engineer, lawyer and politician
Clayton D. Potter (1880–1924), Justice of the Supreme Court of Mississippi
Craig Potter (born 1984), Scottish football player
Cynthia Potter (born 1950), American diver
Dale Potter (born 1949), Canadian football player
Danny Potter (born 1979), English football player
Darren Potter (born 1984), Irish football player
David M. Potter (1910–1971), American historian
Dennis Potter (1935–1994), British playwright
Don Potter (1902–2004), British sculptor and potter
Don Potter (musician), American musician
Dora Joan Potter (1915–1987), Australian children's author
Edmund Potter (1802–1883), British industrialist, MP for Carlisle, Beatrix Potter's grandfather
Edward Clark Potter (1857–1923), American sculptor
Edward Tuckerman Potter (1831–1904), American architect
Elisha Reynolds Potter (1764–1835), American congressman from Rhode Island
Elisha R. Potter (1811–1882), American congressman from Rhode Island, son of Elisha Reynolds Potter
Emery D. Potter (1804–1896), American politician
Frederick Potter (1857–1941), New Zealander businessman 
Fuller Potter (1910–1990), American abstract expressionist artist
George Potter (disambiguation), several people, including:
George Potter (politician) (1883–1945), Australian politician
George Richard Potter (1900–1982), British historian
Gilbert Potter (1878–1921), Irish police officer
Glenn Potter (born c. 1938), American basketball coach
Graham Potter (born 1975), English footballer and manager
Greg Potter, American comic book writer
Harrison Potter (1891–1984), American pianist
Henry Codman Potter (1835–1908), American clergyman
Horatio Potter (1802–1887), American bishop
Ian Potter (born 1968), British writer
Jack Potter (born 1938), Australian cricketer
James Potter (disambiguation), several people
Jenny Potter (born 1979), American ice hockey player
John Potter (disambiguation), several people, including:
John Potter (bishop) (c. 1674–1747), Archbishop of Canterbury
John Potter (Liberal politician) (1815–1858), British Liberal politician
John Potter (Conservative politician) (1873–1940), British Conservative politician
John Potter (footballer) (born 1979), Scottish football player
John E. Potter, American Postmaster General
John F. Potter (1817–1899), American politician
Jon Potter (born 1963), British field hockey player
Jonathan Potter (born 1956), British professor and originator of discursive psychology
Jonathan Potter (cricketer) (born 1971), English cricketer 
Jonathan Potter (computer programmer), Australian programmer
Judith Potter (born 1942), New Zealander judge
K.C. Potter (born 1939), American academic administrator and LGBT rights activist
Kimberly Potter, a 48-year-old police officer convicted of killing Daunte Wright 
Lela Brooks Potter (1908–1990), Canadian speed skater
Luke Potter (born 1989), English football player
Madeleine Potter (born 1958), American actress
Maisie Potter (born 1997), Welsh snowboarder
Mark Potter (sportscaster) (born 1960), Canadian sports broadcaster
Mark Potter (judge) (born 1937), British judge
Mark Potter (musician), British musician from the band Elbow
Martin Potter (actor) (born 1944), British actor
Martin Potter (surfer) (born 1965), British surfer
Matthew Potter, Irish academic
Maureen Potter (1925–2004), Irish actress
Michael Potter (disambiguation), several people, including:
Michael Potter (immunologist) (1924–2013), American physician and immunologist
Michael Potter (born 1963), Australian rugby league footballer and coach
Mike Potter (racing driver) (born 1949), American racecar driver
Mike Potter (baseball) (born 1951), American baseball outfielder
Michael Cressé Potter (1858–1948), English botanist, herbarium curator, and Anglican priest
Mitch Potter (born 1980), American track and field athlete
Monica Potter (born 1971), American actress
 Mary Potter, British-Australian nurse and nun
Neal Potter (1915–2008), American politician
Nels Potter (1911–1999), American baseball player
Nelson Thomas Potter Jr. (1939–2013), American philosopher
Norm Potter (18??–1951), Australian rugby league footballer
Orlando B. Potter (1823–1894), American politician
Patricia Potter (born 1975), British actress
Paulus Potter (1625–1654), Dutch painter
Philip Potter (church leader) (1921–2015), Methodist minister
Philip Potter (1936–2016), British opera singer
Robert Brown Potter (1829–1887), American Civil War General
Robert Potter (1909–2010), British architect
Roger Potter (1907–1982), American basketball coach
Ron Potter, Australian rugby league footballer
Russell Potter (born 1960), American writer
Sally Potter (born 1949), British film director and screenwriter
Samuel J. Potter (1753–1804), American Senator
Sarah Potter (born 1961), English cricketer
Stephen Potter (disambiguation), several people, including:
Stephen Potter (1900–1969), British author of self-help books
Ted Potter (born 1944), Australian rules footballer
Ted Potter Jr. (born 1983), American PGA Tour golfer
Thomas Potter (disambiguation), several people, including:
Thomas Potter (Universalist) (1689–1777), American Universalist
Thomas Potter (industrialist) (1745–1811), Scottish-born Danish industrialist and merchant
Thomas Potter (mayor) (1774–1845), mayor of Manchester, England, father of Thomas Bayley Potter
Thomas Bayley Potter (1817–1898), British politician
Thomas J. Potter (1840–1888), vice-president and general manager of the Union Pacific Railroad
Thomas Rossell Potter (1799–1873), British naturalist
Tom Potter (born 1940), Mayor of Portland, Oregon
Tommy Potter (1918–1988), jazz double bass player
Van Rensselaer Potter (1911–2001), American biochemist
Vincent Potter (c. 1614–1661), army officer, Regicide of King Charles I
William Potter (disambiguation), several people, including:
William Appleton Potter (1842–1909), American architect
William C. Potter, American scientist and professor
William Everett Potter (1905–1988), Governor of Panama Canal Zone
William Knight Potter (1844–1914), businessman and mayor of Providence, Rhode Island
William P. Potter, American naval commander
William Simpson Potter (1805–1879), British author
William W. Potter (Michigan politician) (1869–1940), American politician
William Wilson Potter (1792–1839), American politician

Given name
Potter P. Howard ( 1947–1951), mayor of Boise, Idaho
Potter Palmer (1826–1902), American businessman and Chicago-area developer
Potter Stewart (1915–1985), Associate Justice of the United States Supreme Court. His opinion in the Jacobellis v. Ohio obscenity trial popularized the phrase "I know it when I see it."

Fictional characters
The Potter family, principal characters in A.S. Byatt's "Frederica Quartet" novels: The Virgin in the Garden (1978), Still Life (1985), Babel Tower (1996), and A Whistling Woman (2002)
Bonifacio "Potter", from the Peruvian TV series Al Fondo Hay Sitio
Brian Potter, from the British sitcom Phoenix Nights
Cedric Potter, from Under Capricorn
Clarence Potter, from Harry Turtledove's Southern Victory alternate history novel series
Gail Potter, from the British soap opera Coronation Street
From the Harry Potter series:
Albus Severus Potter, Harry Potter and Ginny Potter (née Weasley)'s son
Ginny Potter (née Weasley), Harry Potter's wife
Harry Potter, title character
James Potter, Lily Potter (née Evans)'s husband and Harry Potter's father
James Sirius Potter, Harry Potter and Ginny Potter (née Weasley)'s son
Lily Luna Potter, Harry Potter and Ginny Potter (née Weasley)'s daughter
Lily Potter (née Evans), James Potter's wife and Harry Potter's mother
Fleamont Potter, James Potter's father and Harry Potter's paternal grandfather
Euphemia Potter, James Potter's mother and Harry Potter's paternal grandmother
Harry Potter Jr., from the film Troll
Mr. Potter, from the film It's A Wonderful Life
Joey Potter, from the TV series Dawson's Creek
Marygay Potter, from Joe Haldeman's science fiction novel The Forever War 
Melvin Potter, a Marvel Comics character, formerly the villain Gladiator
Mr. Potter, from the film The Stranger
Norman Potter, the school caretaker from the British sitcom Please Sir!
Pansy Potter, from The Beano
Peter Potter "Painless", from The Paleface
Peter Potter Jr. "Junior", from Son of Paleface
Professor Potter, a DC Comics character
Sherman T. Potter, from the TV series M*A*S*H and AfterMASH
Tycho Potter, from Margaret Mahy's novel The Catalogue of the Universe

See also
Justice Potter (disambiguation)

References

English-language surnames
Occupational surnames
English-language occupational surnames